The following is a list of symbols of the U.S. state of Arizona. The majority of the items in the list are officially recognized after a law passed by the state legislature. Most of the symbols were adopted in the 20th century. The first symbol was the motto, which was made official in 1864 for the Arizona Territory. Arizona became the second state to adopt a "state firearm" after Utah adopted the Browning M1911.

Insignia

Mottoes and nickname

Plant

Animal

Geology

Culture

Other

See also

List of Arizona-related topics
Lists of United States state insignia
State of Arizona
Vehicle registration plates of Arizona

Notes

References

External links
Arizona's State Symbols

State symbols
Arizona